Du'aine Ladejo (born 14 February 1971, in Paddington, London, England) is an English-born athlete and television personality. In his sports career, he was best known for winning the 400 metres sprint gold medal at the 1994 European Championships and being a member of the United Kingdom and England 400-metre relay squads at the European Championships, Olympics and Commonwealth Games during the 1990s. Ladejo is of mainly Nigerian ancestry

Since retiring from athletics, he has appeared on several television shows including Gladiators, where he is known by his Gladiator alias Predator. Ladejo is also the founder of Du'aine's Fit4Schools, an organisation which raises funds to promote health and fitness in schools. He now works full time as the head of Track & Field at Knox Grammar School, Sydney.

Athletics career 

At the 1994 European Championships, Ladejo won gold medals in both the 400 metres and the 4x400 metres relay. He won the individual sprint in 45.09 seconds, beating his compatriot and defending-champion Roger Black into second place. Ladejo also won the 400 metres gold medal at the European Indoor Championships in both 1994 and 1996. At the 1994 Commonwealth Games, he won a 400 metres silver medal (finishing runner-up to Kenya's Charles Gitonga) and a 4x400 metres relay gold medal. At the Olympic Games, Ladejo won two medals in the 4x400 metres relay – a silver medal in 1996 and a bronze medal in 1992.

Following the 1996 Olympics, Ladejo switched his focus to other athletics events, though he never enjoyed as much success as he did in the 400 metres. He tried his hand at the decathlon, in which he finished seventh at the 1998 Commonwealth Games, and also competed in the 400-metre hurdles.

During his athletics career, Ladejo trained with Birchfield Harriers.

Media career 
For a period during his athletics career, Ladejo also presented a TV show, Du'aine's World, on London Weekend Television. In the early 2000s, Ladejo competed in the BBC TV sports show Superstars, winning the competition in 2004 and finishing runner-up to Alain Baxter in 2005. Ladejo also appeared on the ITV reality TV show Celebrity Love Island in 2005.

Ladejo is the creator and owner of the television show Australia's Greatest Athlete Australia's Greatest Athlete. It aired in 2009, 2010 and 2011 on Network television station Channel 9 and Channel 7 in Australia. It was repeated on Fox sports channel. He is also the owner of the brand and Trademark Greatest Athlete.

In 2008, Ladejo joined the Sky One revival of the TV show Gladiators, competing under the Gladiator alias "Predator".

Education 
Ladejo started his education at Forest Grange School in West Sussex, before going on to King Edward's School, Witley. He completed his high school education in the United States at Medina High School in Medina, Ohio, where he graduated in 1988. He then went on to study radio, television and film at the University of Texas, graduating in 1993.

References

1971 births
Living people
English male sprinters
People from Paddington
Commonwealth Games gold medallists for England
Commonwealth Games silver medallists for England
Commonwealth Games medallists in athletics
Athletes (track and field) at the 1994 Commonwealth Games
Athletes (track and field) at the 1998 Commonwealth Games
Athletes (track and field) at the 1992 Summer Olympics
Athletes (track and field) at the 1996 Summer Olympics
Olympic athletes of Great Britain
Olympic silver medallists for Great Britain
Olympic bronze medallists for Great Britain
People educated at King Edward's School, Witley
Gladiators (1992 British TV series)
Birchfield Harriers
European Athletics Championships medalists
English people of Nigerian descent
Medalists at the 1996 Summer Olympics
Medalists at the 1992 Summer Olympics
Olympic silver medalists in athletics (track and field)
Olympic bronze medalists in athletics (track and field)
Goodwill Games medalists in athletics
Competitors at the 1994 Goodwill Games
Medallists at the 1994 Commonwealth Games